The Enyimba International Stadium is a multi-use stadium in Aba, Nigeria.  It is currently used mostly for football matches and serves as the home ground of Enyimba F.C. The stadium holds 16,000 people following renovations in 2018. Tenants Enyimba were crowned Nigerian football champions several times.

References

Enyimba F.C.
Football venues in Nigeria
Buildings and structures in Aba, Abia